North High Shoals is a town in Oconee County, Georgia, United States. The population was 652 at the 2010 census.

History
The Georgia General Assembly incorporated North High Shoals as a town in 1933. The community was named after shoals in the Apalachee River.

Geography

North High Shoals is located at  (33.834159, -83.501055).

Government

The town's government consists of a Town Council made up of a mayor and five council members.  As of January 1, 2020 these were:
Toby P. Bradberry, Mayor;
Eric Carlson, Council Member, Post 1;
Jason Presley, Council Member, Post 2;
Ann Evans, Council Member, Post 3;
Hilda Kurtz, Council Member, Post 4;
and Violet Dawe, Council Member, Post 5.

Meetings are held on the third Monday of each month at 7:30 pm at the town hall, located at 260 Hillsboro Road.

Demographics

2020 census

As of the 2020 United States census, there were 552 people, 148 households, and 131 families residing in the town.

2010 census
As of the census of 2010, there were 652 people, 144 households, and 117 families residing in the town. The racial makeup of the town was 95.67% White, 1.59% African American, 0.46% Native American, 1.82% Asian, and 0.46% from two or more races. Hispanic or Latino of any race were 1.59% of the population.

At the time of the 2000 census there were 144 households, out of which 51.4% had children under the age of 18 living with them, 72.2% were married couples living together, 6.9% had a female householder with no husband present, and 18.1% were non-families. 13.9% of all households were made up of individuals, and 6.9% had someone living alone who was 65 years of age or older.  The average household size was 3.05 and the average family size was 3.42.

In the town, the population was spread out, with 34.6% under the age of 18, 5.9% from 18 to 24, 31.4% from 25 to 44, 20.7% from 45 to 64, and 7.3% who were 65 years of age or older.  The median age was 33 years. For every 100 females, there were 99.5 males.  For every 100 females age 18 and over, there were 96.6 males.

The median income for a household in the town was $60,208, and the median income for a family was $63,333. Males had a median income of $41,250 versus $28,750 for females. The per capita income for the town was $17,444.  About 6.0% of families and 5.9% of the population were below the poverty line, including 3.0% of those under age 18 and 22.7% of those age 65 or over.

References

External links
 Town's Website

Towns in Oconee County, Georgia
Towns in Georgia (U.S. state)
Athens – Clarke County metropolitan area